Flynas, stylized flynas, formerly Nas Air, is a Saudi low-cost airline, the country first budget airline. The company's head office is located in Riyadh.

History
Saudi Arabian Airlines was the only airline in the country until , when budget carriers Nas Air and Sama Airlines got their licenses from the government. Operations started in February that year. In late 2007, Nas Air firmed up an order for the acquisition of 20 aircraft of the Airbus A320 family.

In January 2017, Flynas signed an agreement to order 80 Airbus A320neo family with deliveries schedule from 2018 to 2026. In November 2018, Flynas took delivery of the first Airbus A320neo family aircraft.

Corporate affairs

Ownership
, Flynas was owned in its majority by National Airline Services Holding (63%); the balance was held by Kingdom Holding.

Destinations 

Assiut and Sharm el Sheikh in Egypt became served by the carrier for the first time in 2009, with flights to the latter initially operated on a seasonal basis. In 2011, the airline started services to three cities in Turkey: Adana, Antakya and Istanbul. Also that year, Lahore in Pakistan became the second city served in the country, after Karachi. In , flights to Yanbu from Dammam were launched. Also that month, the airline started flying from Dammam to Khartoum, with the Sudanese capital becoming the airline’s first international destination to be linked to the Saudi city.

In , Flynas introduced its Global Flight Routes program, aimed at offering affordable rates to passengers for flights between Jeddah and points in Africa, Asia and Europe, and at carrying religious tourists to Saudi Arabia. These aircraft, including both the –200 and the –300 models, would be used to start long-haul services. The airline also planned to add the Airbus A350 to its fleet.

Medium-haul routes to Karachi and Lahore were also planned, along with long-haul services to Jakarta, Kuala Lumpur, Casablanca, Manchester and Islamabad. Flights to Iran were also due to commence by the same time. The London-Gatwick–Riyadh sector would also be served from 27 July the same year. A month later, it was informed that services to Manchester would be discontinued starting , just after  months of operations. Plans were also to serve France next as well as China, Philippines, Nigeria and South Africa later on. However, Manchester was removed from the carrier list of destinations in early , and in October the same year the airline announced the cancellation of most of its long- and mid-haul services owing to poor performance.

In October 2014, Al-Qassim was incorporated to the route network. , Flynas' three top domestic routes in terms of available seats were Jeddah (JED)–Riyadh (RUH), Dammam (DMM)–RUH and JED–DMM. The carrier also performs Hajj services.

Codeshare agreements
A codeshare agreement with Etihad that dates back to  sees Flynas placing its code on a number of flights operated by Etihad that radiate from Abu Dhabi. In May 2016 the airline signed a codeshare agreement with Pegasus Airlines.

In February 2020, Flynas joined the International Air Transport Association (IATA) which will help the company with "greater co-operation" with other member airlines and increase connectivity through codeshare agreements.

Fleet

Current fleet

, the Flynas fleet consists of the following aircraft:

Previously operated
Throughout its history the carrier operated the following aircraft:
 Airbus A310-300
 Airbus A319
 Airbus A330-200
 Boeing 737-500
 Boeing 757-200
 Boeing 747-400
 Boeing 767-300ER
 Embraer 190LR
 Embraer 195AR

See also

 Transport in Saudi Arabia

References

External links
 

Saudi Arabian companies established in 2007
Airlines of Saudi Arabia
Airlines established in 2007
Low-cost carriers
Saudi Arabian brands
2007 establishments in Saudi Arabia